Electoral history of Pavel Grudinin, Russian politician and entrepreneur. Communist party presidential candidate 2018.

Moscow Oblast Duma

1997
2nd constituency:

Pavel Grudinin — 14,346 (38.2%)
Tatyana Rublyova — 8,577 (22.84%)
Alexander Gusev — 4,348 (11.58%)
Mikhail Tkach — 2,463 (6.56%)
Alexander Guskov — 2,128 (5.67%)
Against All — 3,630 (10.23%)

2002
2nd constituency:

Pavel Grudinin — 16,120 (44.76%)
Lyubov Seleznyova — 8,052 (22.36%)
Alexander Levchenko — 4,271 (11.86%)
Nikolay Ageev — 1,240 (3.44%)	
Anatoly Voyevodin — 952 (2.64%)
Valery Kharlamov — 352	(0.98%)
Yelena Kosolapova — 229 (0.64%)
Against All — 3,316 (9.21%)

2016 legislative election

2017 Vidnoye Council of Deputies election
6th constituency:

Pavel Grudinin — 537 (73.6%)
Valery Nifantyev — 161 (22.1%)
Alexey Voronin — 16 (2.2%)
Irina Kashtanova — 15 (2.1%)	
Yury Gusarev — 1 (0.1%)

Speaker of the Vidnoye Council of Deputies

2017 election
Grudinin was the only candidate. Of the 20 deputies, 14 were present.

Pavel Grudinin — 14

2019 dismissal
On February 15, 2019, a vote was held to remove Grudinin from office. Of the 20 deputies, 19 were present.

For dismissal — 11
Against dismissal — 7
Abstained — 1

2018 presidential election

Left Front primary

Communist Party nomination

General election

References

Grudinin